Warrington Township is the name of two townships in the US state of Pennsylvania:
 Warrington Township, Bucks County, Pennsylvania
 Warrington Township, York County, Pennsylvania

Pennsylvania township disambiguation pages